Andy Knowles (born 22 March 1955) is a Bahamian former swimmer. He competed in two events at the 1976 Summer Olympics.

References

External links
 

1955 births
Living people
Bahamian male swimmers
Olympic swimmers of the Bahamas
Swimmers at the 1976 Summer Olympics
Sportspeople from Nassau, Bahamas